Pauline Bush may refer to:
Pauline Bush (actress) (1886–1969), silent film actor in the early 1900s
Pauline Joran (1870–1954), opera singer who married the Baron de Bush in 1899
Pauline Robinson Bush, daughter of President George H.W. Bush